North Mayfair is a historic neighborhood in Far North Side, Chicago, Illinois. It is located within Albany Park on the city's Far North Side.

North Mayfair is renowned for its historic architecture. In 2010, This Old House Magazine listed North Mayfair as being one of the best "Old House" neighborhoods in the United States.

The entire North Mayfair neighborhood is listed on the National Register of Historic Places.

See also
National Register of Historic Places listings in North Side Chicago

References

Neighborhoods in Chicago
North Side, Chicago
Historic districts in Chicago
Buildings and structures on the National Register of Historic Places in Chicago
Chicago Landmarks